Matterral Richardson (born June 30, 1985) is a former American Football cornerback. He was signed by the Washington Redskins as an undrafted free agent in 2008. He played college football at Arkansas.

Richardson has also played for the Houston Texans, New York Sentinels, Cleveland Browns and Toronto Argonauts.

Professional career

Washington Redskins
In his first ever preseason game with the Redskins, the Pro Football Hall of Fame Game, Richardson intercepted a ball thrown by Indianapolis Colts quarterback Jared Lorenzen and returned it for a touchdown.

Houston Texans
Richardson was signed off the Washington Redskins' practice squad by the Houston Texans on November 26, 2008 after running back Ahman Green was placed on injured reserve.

New York Sentinels
In 2009, Richardson signed with the New York Sentinels of the United Football League. He was later released by the Sentinels.

Cleveland Browns
Shortly after his release from the Sentinels, Richardson returned to the NFL and signed with the Cleveland Browns, remaining with the team for the duration of the 2009 NFL season. In 2010, Richardson was released by the team as a final training camp cut.

Toronto Argonauts
On February 4, 2011, Richardson signed with the Toronto Argonauts of the Canadian Football League. He was released on June 1, 2011.

References

External links

Just Sports Stats
Arkansas Razorbacks bio
Houston Texans bio
Washington Redskins bio
Toronto Argonauts bio
 

1985 births
Living people
People from Marlin, Texas
American football cornerbacks
Arkansas Razorbacks football players
Washington Redskins players
Houston Texans players
New York Sentinels players
Cleveland Browns players